Ed Richards (born 3 July 1999) is a professional Australian rules footballer playing for the Western Bulldogs in the Australian Football League (AFL). He was drafted by the Western Bulldogs with their second selection and sixteenth overall in the 2017 national draft. His family has a long history in the VFL/AFL, particularly the Collingwood Football Club, whereby his great-great-grandfather is Charlie Pannam Sr., his grandfather is Ron Richards, and his great uncle is Lou Richards.

Statistics
Statistics are correct to the end of round 1, 2021.

|- style=background:#EAEAEA
| scope=row | 2018 ||  || 20
| 21 || 8 || 5 || 166 || 119 || 285 || 56 || 51 || 0.4 || 0.2 || 7.9 || 5.7 || 13.6 || 2.7 || 2.4
|-
| scope=row | 2019 ||  || 20
| 20 || 9 || 13 || 138 || 95 || 233 || 56 || 47 || 0.5 || 0.7 || 6.9 || 4.8 || 11.7 || 2.8 || 2.4
|- style=background:#EAEAEA
| scope=row | 2020 ||  || 20
| 17 || 6 || 7 || 93 || 90 || 183 || 24 || 34 || 0.4 || 0.4 || 5.5 || 5.3 || 10.8 || 1.4 || 2.0
|-class=sortbottom
! colspan=3 | Career
! 58 !! 23 !! 25 !! 397 !! 304 !! 701 !! 136 !! 132 !! 0.4 !! 0.4 !! 6.8 !! 5.2 !! 12.1 !! 2.3 !! 2.3
|}

Notes

References

External links

1999 births
Living people
Western Bulldogs players
Oakleigh Chargers players
Australian rules footballers from Victoria (Australia)
People educated at Carey Baptist Grammar School
Australian people of Greek descent